Alexander Leonidovich Shemansky (11 May 1900, Irkutsk — 1 April 1976, Los Angeles) was a Russian opera singer (tenor).

He studied at the Irkutsk Cadet Corps; in the Civil War he served as a second lieutenant in the Russian Far East. He emigrated to Harbin, studied singing at the Osipova-Zarzhevskoy. In exile, he was a soloist at the Opera Harbin Railway Assembly, toured with the Italian Opera Company "Capri" in Asian countries. In Harbin, in 1936, played a concert together with Feodor Chaliapin. In the 1960s he moved to the United States, where he taught singing in Los Angeles.

References

External links 
Biographical pointer 
Center for Genealogical Research  
Alexander Shemansky 

1900 births
1976 deaths
People of the Russian Civil War
White Russian emigrants to China
Russian operatic tenors
20th-century Russian male opera singers
Musicians from Irkutsk
Chinese emigrants to the United States